Minkhaung Medaw (b. ) was a Burmese princess in the early Ava period. The youngest daughter of Swa Saw Ke and Khame Mi, she became a princess in 1367 when her father ascended to the Ava throne. The princess was married to Prince Sithu Min Oo of Pinya, who was probably at least four decades her senior, perhaps in a marriage alliance arranged by her father. The couple had two children: Sithu Thanbawa and Thray Sithu of Myinsaing. Kings Mingyi Nyo, Tabinshwehti and Nanda of the Toungoo dynasty were descended from her.

Ancestry
The princess was descended from the Pagan royal line from her paternal side.

Notes

References

Bibliography
 
 
 
 

Ava dynasty
1350s births